The 2021 FC Caspiy season was Caspiy's the second season back in the Kazakhstan Premier League, the highest tier of association football in Kazakhstan, since 2001. Caspiy will also take part in the Kazakhstan Cup.

Season events
On 26 February, Caspiy announced the signings of Taras Bondarenko, Chafik Tigroudja, Aslan Darabayev and Ruslan Mingazow.

On 1 March, Caspiy announced the signing of Aleksey Zaleski, David Karayev on loan from Ural Yekaterinburg and Talgat Kusyapov and Ramazan Karimov on loan from Astana.

On 5 March, Caspiy announced the signing of Maksim Gladchenko and Nikola Cuckić, whilst Niyaz Shugaev joined on loan from Shakhter Karagandy.

On 15 July, Stefan Bukorac joined Shakhter Karagandy on loan for the remainder of the season.

On 22 July, Arman Nusip left Caspiy after his contract was terminated by mutual consent.

On 30 July, Caspiy announced the loan signings of Jean-Ali Payruz from Shakhter Karagandy and Uladzimir Khvashchynski from Dinamo Minsk, both on contracts till the end of the season.

Squad

Out on loan

Transfers

In

Loans in

Out

Loans out

Released

Competitions

Overview

Premier League

Results summary

Results by round

Results

League table

Kazakhstan Cup

Group stage

Knockout stages

Squad statistics

Appearances and goals

|-
|colspan="16"|Players away from Caspiy on loan:

|-
|colspan="16"|Players who left Caspiy during the season:

|}

Goal scorers

Clean sheets

Disciplinary record

References

External links

FC Caspiy seasons
Caspiy